Robot Commando is a single-player roleplaying gamebook written by Steve Jackson (the American game designer, rather than the series co-creator), illustrated by Gary Mayes and originally published in 1986 by Puffin Books. It forms part of Steve Jackson and Ian Livingstone's Fighting Fantasy series. It is the 22nd in the series in the original Puffin series.

Story

The reader takes the role of a dinosaur rancher in the country of Thalos on a distant planet who finds themself in the middle of an attack by Thalos' mortal enemy, the militaristic Karosseans.  A strange weapon is unleashed which causes all of Thalos, save the protagonist, to fall into a deep sleep and leaves the land free to be invaded. Over the course of the adventure, the reader gets the opportunity to control a variety of giant robots in his battles against dinosaurs and Karossean invaders while looking for a way to drive off the Karosseans and rouse his countrymen.

Robot Commando is one of the few entries in the Fighting Fantasy series to feature multiple successful endings.

References

 
 
 

1986 fiction books
Fighting Fantasy gamebooks
Books by Steve Jackson (American game designer)
Space opera gamebooks